An intelligent banknote neutralisation system (IBNS) is a security system which protects valuable items by rendering them unusable or easily detectable if an unauthorised individual tries to gain access to them. Dye packs are commonly used to safeguard currency against bank robberies in this manner; when such a pack is taken out of the bank, it releases an indelible dye that stains the money with a conspicuous bright color, making it easy to recognise as stolen. Bonding agents (glues) have been used more recently as alternative degradation agents.

Well-neutralised banknotes cannot be brought back into circulation easily. They can be linked to the crime scene and restricted procedures are in place to exchange them at the financial institution. This makes stealing neutralised banknotes uneconomical and impractical. The IBNS removes the anticipated reward of the crime and increases the risk of being caught. This not only foils the theft but acts as a deterrent against further attacks.

History 
In Europe the design of intelligent systems to protect valuables began in 1980. The overall goal was to create a secure system to provide additional security for cash-in-transit. The very first IBNS prototype using coloured smoke as neutralisation agent was invented by Spinnaker International Ltd in 1982. This made use of very lightweight and simple to use containers.
In 1990, the first case of safety ink as a neutralizing agent was accepted to be used in soft-skinned vehicles.

At the same time in Sweden IBNS systems manufactured by Spinnaker, were being used in non-armoured and partially armoured vehicles, demonstrating that this was a viable alternative to cash transportation with armoured trucks. The Swedish market decided to progress with IBNS boxes for cash transport.

In 1991 France changed its regulations to allow the use of IBNS in soft-skinned vehicles. The French CIT company VALTIS was the first to implement such a system to service three regional banks. In 2002, Banque de France implemented an international procedure to treat and exchange neutralized banknotes for CIT professionals.  In 2003, the European Central Bank made a decision that defined the process and cost of exchanging neutralized Euro Banknotes among all National Central Banks in Europe.  In 2005, Banque de France implemented a special procedure regarding the treatment of stained banknotes deposited by private persons. In 2007, Sweden implemented a national regulation making the use of IBNS by CIT obligatory. The same year, the Belgian government also implemented a national regulation imposing the use of IBNS for cash-in-transit.

In 2010, the European Commission finalized a European regulation to harmonize cross-border cash transportation by road. The use of non-armoured vehicles in combination with IBNS is one of two accepted methods of transportation.

Concept 

The concept of an IBNS is based upon the notion that criminals seek to maximize their reward while minimizing the potential cost of the crime. Intelligent Banknote Neutralisation Systems remove the anticipated reward of the crime and increase the risk of being caught. Reducing the reward of the crime is done by permanently marking the cash as stolen with an indelible security ink or bonding agent. Tracers and markers added to the ink or bonding agent provide forensic evidence linking the criminal to the crime scene, increasing the risk of being caught.

IBNS focuses on using technology to protect people, valuables and equipment whilst minimizing the use of weapons and armoured vehicles.

Dye pack

A dye pack is a radio-controlled device used by banks to foil a bank robbery by causing stolen cash to be permanently marked with dye shortly after a robbery. They were invented in the United States in Georgia, in 1965.  In most cases, a dye pack is placed in a hollowed-out space within a stack of banknotes, usually $10 or $20 bills. This stack of bills looks and feels identical to a real one, but usually subtly marked in a way that is only privy to selected bank employees. The development of flexible dye packs makes it virtually impossible to detect by persons handling the stack.

A stack of bills fitted with a dye pack is generally stored next to a magnetic plate at a bank teller's workstation. Under these conditions, it remains in standby or safe mode until a bank employee removes it from the plate and hands it to a robber, causing it to become armed. Once the pack is taken out of the building, a radio transmitter located at the door triggers a timer (typically at least 10 seconds), after which the dye pack explosively releases an aerosol (usually of Disperse Red 9) and sometimes tear gas. The release is intended to mark the money and/or the robber's body with a brightly colored stain so that they can be easily recognized as having been involved in a crime. Depending on the specific contents of the pack, the release may incapacitate the robber and/or destroy the money as well.
Dye packs are used to foil robberies in over 75% of banks in the U.S.

Application 
IBNS technology is typically found protecting cash inside ATMs; in retail establishments and vending machines and by the cash in transit industry to protect cash in the public space.

Legislation and regulations 

The use of IBNS is usually regulated by the presence or absence of a legal structure (legislation and regulations) as well as the legal conditions applying to the private security sector.

The following countries allow neutralisation of national banknotes by the National Central Bank:
 Permit the use of IBNS without legal or professional regulation or other restriction: Latvia, Lithuania, Estonia, Bosnia, Slovenia, UK, Austria, Netherlands, Switzerland.
 Legal regulation permits use of IBNS upon citing the regulation: Italy, Netherlands, Norway, Denmark, Finland.
 Legal regulation permit to use IBNS with technical agreement: Portugal, Croatia, France, Sweden, Belgium, Germany, Ireland, Luxembourg, Hungary, Italy.
 Legal regulation forbids unrestricted use of IBNS: Poland, Romania.

These countries forbid neutralising of national banknotes by legal regulation or internal regulation by the National Central Bank: Indonesia, Philippines, Thailand, Egypt, Argentina, Chile, Paraguay and others.

See also

Ink tag
Security bag

References

External links 
 EURICPA - European Intelligent Cash Protection Association
 Banknote Watch - a crime prevention initiative
European Association for Secured Transactions (EAST)
ATM Security Association

Bank robbery
Security technology
Non-lethal weapons
British inventions